A season after promotion, Betis finished third and reached the Copa del Rey final.

Squad
Squad at end of season

Left club during season

Competitions

La Liga

League table

Results by round

Source: LFP 1-4 5-8 9-12 13-16 17-20 21-22

Note: UEFA Cup Winners' Cup spot (in yellow) being non-related with a position in La Liga, does not appear until the team is assured to be qualified. Conditions to be assured are: Copa del Rey winner cannot reach UEFA Champions League's places or one of finalists' Copa del Rey cannot qualify mathematically to UEFA Champions League. Barcelona was qualified to UEFA Champions League since 39th round, thus Betis could not reach UEFA Champions League places, so after matchday 39 Betis' places are coloured in yellow. In light yellow the spot expected for 1997–98 UEFA Cup Winners' Cup.

Matches

Copa del Rey

Second Round

Third Round

Round of 16

Quarterfinals

Semifinals

Final

Statistics

Player statistics

References

Real Betis seasons
Real Betis